Isah Salihu (born 2 November 1991) is a Nigerian sprinter specialising in the 400 metres. He represented his country in the 4 × 400 metres relay at one outdoor and two indoor World Championships. His personal best in the event is 46.15 seconds set in Calabar in 2014.

Competition record

1Disqualified in the final

References

External links

1991 births
Living people
Nigerian male sprinters
People from Niger State
Athletes (track and field) at the 2014 Commonwealth Games
Athletes (track and field) at the 2018 Commonwealth Games
People from Bida
Commonwealth Games competitors for Nigeria
21st-century Nigerian people